Bathley is a village and civil parish in the Newark and Sherwood district of Nottinghamshire, England, north-west of Newark-on-Trent. According to the 2001 census it had a population of 246. Bathley is recorded in the Domesday Book as Badeleie.

As Bathley does not have a hall of any sort, the Crown Inn public house is used for family parties, christenings and funerals as well as Parish Council meetings.

The local Parish Council currently comprises:

David Adam BRADLEY

Brian Walter CROSS

James Henry HAWKINS

Dominic HENEGHAN

Hilary HENEGHAN

Julie Darlene PULFORD

Madeleine REED

See also
Listed buildings in Bathley

References

External links

Villages in Nottinghamshire
Newark and Sherwood